Rustington F.C. is an English football club based in Rustington, near Littlehampton in West Sussex.

History
They club were established in 1903 and joined the Bognor District League. After World War I they joined the Littlehampton District League, winning it in 1932–33, 1933–34, 1947–48 and 1948–49. They later joined the West Sussex League, which they won in 1999–2000 and again in 2003–04. They then joined Division Three of the Sussex County League. In 2006–07 they won Division Three, going unbeaten in the league for the whole of 2006, this resulted them being featured on Sky Sports. The record was to remain until 24 February 2007, when it was ended by Haywards Heath. They become champions of Division Two in 2017-18 and 2018-19 but were ineligible for promotion to Division One of the Southern Combination. They were also champions three seasons in a row in the 2021–22 season. The club is currently sponsored by British rock band Royal Blood.

Honours

League honours
Southern Combination League Division Two
Champions (3) 2017–18, 2018–19, 2021–22
Sussex County Football League Division Three
Champions 2006–07
 West Sussex Football League Premier Division:
Champions (2): 1999–00, 2003–04
 West Sussex Football League Division Three South:
Champions (1): 1970–71

Cup honours
The Sussex Royal Ulster Rifles Charity Cup
 Runners Up (1): 2008–09
Sussex County Football Association
Sussex Intermediate Cup
Winners(2) 2005–06, 2017–18
Sussex Junior Challenge Cup
Winners 2000–01
Division Two Challenge Cup
Winners 2018-19
Runners up 2007–08
Sussex County Football League Division Three Cup:
 Winners (2): 2004–05, 2005–06
Vernon Wentworth Invitation Cup
Winners 2004–05, 2005–06, 2006–07
Centenary Cup
Winners 1999–2000
Malcolm Simmonds Memorial Cup
Winners 1974–75, 1975–76
Bareham Trophy (Rustington Reserves)
Winners 1995–96, 1998–99, 2003–04

Club records
Highest League Position:
3rd in Sussex County League Division Two (Old Division One): 2007–08
Highest Attendance:
454 vs Littlehampton Town: 2006–07

References

External links

 Official Club Website

Arun District
Southern Combination Football League
Football clubs in West Sussex
Association football clubs established in 1903
Football clubs in England
1903 establishments in England
West Sussex Football League